Big Island, Nova Scotia is a peninsula located in Pictou County, Nova Scotia. Prospector Robert Henderson of Big Island brought the first gold out of the Klondike in 1896, leading indirectly to the Klondike Gold Rush.

References

Navigator

Landforms of Pictou County
Peninsulas of Nova Scotia